Cheryl Woodcock (born in Oklahoma City, Oklahoma) is an  entertainment producer and on-air personality for Entertainment Tonight and ET's The Insider.

Woodcock attended Arizona State University, where she graduated with a B.S. in Criminal Justice.  She is married, has two children and currently resides in Mexico.

Cheryl Woodcock is a Correspondent and Segment Producer for THE INSIDER. She has been a Correspondent of the show since 2005 and a producer since its inception in 2004. Previously, she served as a Segment Producer for Entertainment Tonight since 2001.

In May 2007, Woodcock traveled to the 2007 Cannes Film Festival to sit down with celebrities including Leonardo DiCaprio, Don Cheadle, Brad Pitt, George Clooney and Matt Damon to discuss their latest movie, Ocean's Thirteen.

Woodcock also contributes to a celebrity-based column for Los Angeles Confidential magazine and for the DC-based glossy Capitol File.

Woodcock recently appeared on two episodes of The Bold and the Beautiful as a reporter.

Woodcock has appeared on Larry King Live, and has done numerous exclusive interviews on Larry King himself.

Woodcock covered the 2008 National Democratic Convention in Denver, Colorado.

The daughter of a former state legislator, Woodcock became interested in national politics when Jimmy Carter stayed with her family during the 1976 presidential primary elections.  She is a champion of the environment along with her brother in-law, Dana Williams, who is currently Mayor of Park City, Utah in his second term.  She is a proud soccer mom and lives in Beverly Hills with her husband and two children.

Woodcock has interviewed many A-list actors and bold-faced names including Barbara Walters, Ben Affleck, Orlando Bloom, Leonardo DiCaprio, Donald Trump, Keith Olbermann, Jack Valenti, Paris, Kathy, and Nikki Hilton, Rosie O'Donnell, Arianna Huffington, Patrick Dempsey, Ellen Barkin, Matthew Perry, Hilary Swank, Eva Longoria, John Voight, James Caan, Brooke Shields, Forest Whitaker, Vanna White, Miley Cyrus, Ellen Pompeo, George Clooney, Brad Pitt, Matt Damon, Don Cheadle, Rosanna Arquette, Danni and Anjelica Huston, Hugh Heffner, Bill Clinton, Al Gore, Marcia Cross, Denise Richards, Tom Hanks, Sylvester Stallone, Bruce Willis, Eric Dane, Aaron Eckhart, Billy Bob Thornton, Jeremy Piven, Bill Paxton, Jeremy Irons, Mark Whalberg, Heidi Klum, Clive Davis, Jennifer Hudson, Keiffer Sutherland, Minnie Drive, Jolie Fisher, Kyra Sedwick, Alejandro Gonzales Innarutu, Matt Dillon, Harry Connick Jr., Hilary Swank, Jeffry Dean Morgan, Roger King, and Gerard Butler.

External links

Year of birth missing (living people)
Living people
Television personalities from California
American women television personalities
Arizona State University alumni
People from Beverly Hills, California
Businesspeople from Oklahoma City